Choline-phosphate cytidylyltransferase is an enzyme that catalyzes the chemical reaction

CTP + choline phosphate  diphosphate + CDP-choline

where the two substrates of this enzyme are CTP and choline phosphate, and the two products are diphosphate and CDP-choline.  It is responsible for regulating phosphatidylcholine content in membranes.

This enzyme belongs to the family of transferases, specifically those transferring phosphorus-containing nucleotide groups (nucleotidyltransferases).  The systematic name of this enzyme class is CTP:choline-phosphate cytidylyltransferase. Other names in common use include phosphorylcholine transferase, CDP-choline pyrophosphorylase, CDP-choline synthetase, choline phosphate cytidylyltransferase, CTP-phosphocholine cytidylyltransferase, CTP:phosphorylcholine cytidylyltransferase, cytidine diphosphocholine pyrophosphorylase, phosphocholine cytidylyltransferase, phosphorylcholine cytidylyltransferase, and phosphorylcholine:CTP cytidylyltransferase.  This enzyme participates in aminophosphonate metabolism and glycerophospholipid metabolism.

Structural studies

References

 
 
 

EC 2.7.7
Enzymes of known structure